This is a list of pro-Russian political parties outside of Russia.

By country

Armenia

Australia

Belarus

Bosnia and Herzegovina

Bulgaria

Estonia

Finland

Georgia

Greece

Italy

Kyrgyzstan

Latvia

Lithuania

Moldova

Montenegro

Poland

Portugal

Serbia

Slovakia

Turkey

Ukraine

See also 
 Putinism
 Russosphere

References

Notes

Pro-Russian